Skinty Fia is the third studio album by Irish rock band Fontaines D.C. It was released on 22 April 2022 via Partisan Records. Like the band's two previous albums – 2019's Dogrel and 2020's A Hero's Death – Skinty Fia was produced by Dan Carey. Its title refers to an old Irish saying that drummer Tom Coll’s great-aunt used to say. The phrase "Skinty Fia" translates to "the damnation of the deer". Both the title and the cover art allude to the extinct Irish elk, also known as the "giant deer".

Skinty Fia became the band's first number-one album in both Ireland and the UK.

The album garnered the band a win for the Brit Award for International Group at the 2023 Brit Awards and a nomination for Album of the Year at the Choice Music Prize for the year 2022.

Promotion 
The album was announced on 12 January 2022, to coincide with the release of its lead single "Jackie Down the Line". A second single, "I Love You", was released just over a month later on 17 February 2022, a song which the band described as “the first overtly political song we’ve written”

Track listing
All music by Grian Chatten, Tom Coll, Conor Curley, Conor Deegan III and Carlos O'Connell. All lyrics by Grian Chatten, except "Big Shot", lyrics by Carlos O'Connell.

Personnel
Fontaines D.C.
 Grian Chatten – vocals, accordion, 12-string acoustic guitar, tambourine
 Carlos O'Connell – guitar, art direction
 Conor Curley – guitar
 Tom Coll – drums, percussion
 Conor Deegan III – bass guitar

Additional personnel
 Dan Carey – production, mixing, sonic manipulation, synthesizer
 Christian Wright – mastering
 Alexis Smith – engineering
 Aidan Cochrane – art direction, design
 Rory Dewar – design
 Ashley Willerton – lettering

Charts

Weekly charts

Year-end charts

References

External links

2022 albums
Fontaines D.C. albums
Partisan Records albums
Albums produced by Dan Carey (record producer)